Vyacheslav Osnovin (born 5 March 1994) is a Russian professional ice hockey center. He is currently under contract with HC Sibir Novosibirsk of the Kontinental Hockey League (KHL).

Playing career
He made his KHL debut playing with Traktor Chelyabinsk during the 2012–13 KHL season. On November 30, 2018, Vyacheslav Osnovin along with Savely Kuvardin and  Alexander Lyakhov were traded to Ak Bars Kazan for Alexander Burmistrov from Salavat Yulaev.

References

External links

1994 births
Living people
Ak Bars Kazan players
HC CSKA Moscow players
Russian ice hockey centres
Salavat Yulaev Ufa players
HC Sibir Novosibirsk players
Traktor Chelyabinsk players
Sportspeople from Chelyabinsk